Vespa is a line of motor scooters manufactured by Piaggio.

Vespa may also refer to:

Other vehicles 
 Vespa 400, a Piaggio-made microcar (1957–1961)
 Vickers Vespa, a 1920s British aircraft

Science 
 Vespa (constellation)
 Vespa (genus), the true hornets
 6062 Vespa, an asteroid

Other uses
 Vespa (horse) (foaled 1830), a British racehorse
 Princess Vespa, a Spaceballs character

People with the surname Vespa 
Amleto Vespa (1884 – ), Italian mercenary and spy
Bruno Vespa (born 1944), Italian journalist
Jeff Vespa (born 1970), American photographer
Líber Vespa (born 1971), Uruguayan footballer

See also
Vesta (disambiguation)